Spruha Joshi (born 13 October 1989) is an Indian television, film, and theatre actress, the television anchor who works in the Marathi film and television industry. She is also a poet and lyricist for films.

Early life and education
Spruha Joshi was born in Dadar, Mumbai, on 13 October 1989, the first child of Shirish Madhusudan Joshi and Shreeya Shirish Joshi (née Alaka Arvind Terdalkar). She completed her schooling from Balmohan Vidyamandir, Dadar, and then graduated from Ruia College.

Career
She made her film acting debut in the 2004 drama movie Maay Baap. She played the role of a teenage classical music student. After her debut, she took a break from films to complete her graduation. While she was in Ramnarain Ruia College, she acted in many plays like GaMaBhaNa, Yugmak, Ek Aur Maiyyat, Santa, Ek Ashi Vyakti, Koi Aisa, Canvas and Ananyaa. Her first noticeable role on TV was of Uma Band in Agnihotra. In 2011, she was seen in the film Morya directed by Avadhoot Gupte. In the same year, she was seen in the TV show Eka Lagnachi Dusri Goshta as Kuhu starring Mukta Barve and Swapnil Joshi in lead roles. In 2012, she performed the lead role of Ramabai Ranade in Unch Maaza Zoka, which was directed by Viren Pradhan. She also played child artist role in Marathi serial De Dhamal on Zee Marathi.

In 2013, Spruha was seen in the show Eka Lagnachi Teesri Goshta as a lead character Advocate Isha Deshmukh. Spruha's next film was A Paying Ghost alongside Umesh Kamat. The film received positive reviews from critics and audience. Spruha's next film Bioscope was released on 17 July 2015. It incorporates four short films directed by four different directors Ravi Jadhav, Gajendra Ahire, Girish Mohite, and Viju Mane – all based on four poems by well-known poets. Spruha will be seen in Viju Mane's Ek Hota Kau, based on poet Kishor Kadam's poem by same name. In addition to acting in films, Spruha also writes poems and lyrics for Marathi albums and movies. Spruha's next film Lost and Found will be releasing on 29 July. The film produced by Golden Gate Motion Pictures is a love story and has Siddharth Chandekar as the male lead. She starred in series Prem He on Zee Yuva in 2017 opposite Siddharth Chandekar, a series that depicted various situations among the journey of various loving couples. She also starred opposite Gashmeer Mahajani in Mala Kahich Problem Nahi in 2017. She also starred opposite Ankush Choudhary in Deva in 2018.

She is currently the anchor of Colors Marathi musical program "Sur Nava Dhyas Nava".

In 2019, she is appearing in a Marathi thriller film Vicky Velingkar as Vidya. Sonalee Kulkarni is appearing in the film in titular role.

Filmography

Films

Television and web series

Theatre

Commercial

Songs

Personal life
Her father works in a Trimax Company and her mother is a housewife. Her younger sister Kshipra Joshi is a sportswoman. She is married to Varad Laghate on 28 November 2014.
They were in a romantic relationship for five years prior to their marriage.

Books written
 Lopamudra 
 Chandanchura  - A collection of poems

References

External links 

 
 

1989 births
Living people
Marathi people
Indian television actresses
Actresses in Marathi theatre
Actresses in Marathi cinema
21st-century Indian actresses
Indian women singers
Indian women singer-songwriters
Indian singer-songwriters
Indian writers
21st-century Indian writers